Bobby Reynolds won in the final, 3-6, 7-5, 7-5 against Marinko Matosevic.

Seeds

  Ryan Sweeting (second round)
  Brian Dabul (semifinals, retired)
  Kevin Kim (first round)
  Donald Young (semifinals)
  Michael Yani (withdrew due to elbow injury)
  Robert Kendrick (first round)
  Conor Niland (first round)
  Alex Kuznetsov (second round)

Draw

Finals

Top half

Bottom half

References
Main Draw
Qualifying Singles

Weil Tennis Academy Challenger - Singles